Baron Altham, of Altham in the County of Cork, was a title in the Peerage of Ireland. It was created in 1681 for the Honourable Altham Annesley, younger son of Arthur Annesley, 1st Earl of Anglesey and Elizabeth Altham, daughter and co-heiress of Sir James Altham (see Viscount Valentia for earlier history of the Annesley family). The title was created with remainder to heirs male and in default thereof to his younger brothers and their male issue. In 1689 he was attainted by the Irish Parliament of James II and his estates were sequestered. However, after the deposition of James II he was restored and allowed to take his seat in the Irish House of Lords in 1695. He was succeeded by his son James, the second Baron, who died as an infant shortly after his father. The late Baron was succeeded according to the special remainder by his uncle Richard Annesley, the third Baron. He was a clergyman and served as Dean of Exeter. He was succeeded by his son, Arthur, the fourth Baron, whose son and rightful heir James Annesley was overlooked for the succession by his uncle, Richard Anglesey, the fifth Baron Altham and later sixth Earl of Anglesey. For further history of the legal battle that followed and the descent of the title, see Viscount Valentia.

Barons Altham (1681)
Altham Annesley, 1st Baron Altham (d. 1699)
James George Annesley, 2nd Baron Altham (d. 1700)
Richard Annesley, 3rd Baron Altham (1655–1701)
Arthur Annesley, 4th Baron Altham (1689–1727)
Richard Annesley, 6th Earl of Anglesey, 5th Baron Altham (1694–1761)
Arthur Annesley, 1st Earl of Mountnorris, 6th Baron Altham (1744–1816)
George Annesley, 2nd Earl of Mountnorris, 7th Baron Altham (1769–1844)

See also
Earl of Anglesey
Viscount Valentia
Earl Annesley

References

Baron
Extinct baronies in the Peerage of Ireland
Noble titles created in 1681
Peerages created with special remainders